The Barn may refer to:

 The Barn (comic strip), comic created by Canadian cartoonist Ralph Hagen and syndicated by Creators Syndicate
 The Barn (film), a 2016 horror film
 The Barn (recording studio), the former Alan Irish Barn, an art and music studio in Vermont, United States
 "The Barn", the nickname of the fictitious Farmington Police Station in the television series The Shield
 The Barn Church, first barn church to be consecrated in England

Sports venues
 The Barn (Xavier University of Louisiana), at Xavier University of Louisiana 
 Community Choice Credit Union Convention Center, or "The Barn", historically known as Veterans Memorial Auditorium, in Des Moines, Iowa, US
 St. Louis Arena, or "The Barn", formerly known as the Checkerdome, in St. Louis, Missouri, US
 Williams Arena, or "The Barn", at the University of Minnesota, Twin Cities, US
 Windsor Arena, or "The Barn", in Windsor, Ontario, Canada

Other uses
 The Barn (Los Angeles), a house built by A. Quincy Jones

See also 

 Barn (disambiguation)